"Surviving the Times" is a 2007 hip hop song by Nas from his Greatest Hits album. The song's lyrics focus on Nas career before and just after Illmatic. The song makes reference to Nas' signing with Columbia Records, being turned down by Russell Simmons for Def Jam and him meeting Large Professor and Kool G Rap for the first time. The song also samples Nipsey Russell's song "What Would I Do If I Could Feel" from the musical The Wiz in the intro and chorus. A different version of this song appeared on Nas and DJ Green Lantern's Nigger Tape. It contains the same lyrics but is produced by Cool & Dre.

Nas had this to say about the song:

2007 songs
2007 singles
Nas songs
Songs written by Nas
Columbia Records singles